Maklibè Kouloum (born 5 October 1987) is a Togolese international footballer who plays for Dynamic Togolais as a midfielder.

Career
Kouloum has played for Kakadlé Défalé, ASKO Kara and Dynamic Togolais.

He made his international debut in 2016, and was named in the squad for the 2017 Africa Cup of Nations.

References

1987 births
Living people
Togolese footballers
Togo international footballers
ASKO Kara players
Dynamic Togolais players
Association football midfielders
2017 Africa Cup of Nations players
21st-century Togolese people